Etanna clopaea is a species of moth of the family Nolidae first described by Turner in 1902. It is found in Australia, including Queensland, New South Wales and the Australian Capital Territory.

Adults are brown with light and dark wavy markings on the forewings.

References

Moths described in 1902
Chloephorinae